The organisation of the Bharatiya Janata Party (BJP) is based upon the Constitution of the Bharatiya Janata Party. The organisation of the BJP is strictly hierarchical, with the president being the highest authority in the party. The party is considered to be a cadre-based party that draws from the Hindutva-based ideology of its parent organisation, the Rashtriya Swayamsevak Sangh.

, it is the country's largest political party in terms of representation in the national parliament and state assemblies and is the world's largest party in terms of primary membership.

Parent organisation
The Rashtriya Swayamsevak Sangh is considered as the parent organisation of BJP. BJP also draws its membership from the organisation of the Sangh Parivar.

Departments
The BJP on the national level has several publicly known internal departments, such as:

 Good Governance 
 Policy Research
 Media
 Media Relations
 Training
 Political Feedback and Response
 National Programs and Meetings
 Documentation and Library
 Sahayog and Disaster Relief Service
 President Office Tours and Programs
 Publicity Literature 
 Coordination of Trusts
 Election Management
 Election Commission
 Legal Affairs
 Party Journals and Publications
 IT, Website and Social Media Management (popularly known as the BJP IT Cell)
 Foreign Affairs

The BJP does not publicly release more information about these departments aside from their respective heads.

National level

National President

The organisation of the BJP is strictly hierarchical, with the president being the highest authority in the party. According to the party's constitution, the president is elected by an electoral college consisting of the National Council and the State Councils. Until 2012, the BJP constitution mandated that any qualified member could be national or state president for a single three-year term. This was amended to a maximum of two consecutive terms.

National Executive
The National Executive of Bharatiya Janata Party is the presidium and chief executive body of the Bharatiya Janata Party setting the overall strategic direction of the party and policy development. It is composed of members appointed by the BJP president and can have as many as 120 members.

Below the president is the National Executive of the Bharatiya Janata Party, which contains a variable number of senior leaders from across the country appointed by the President of the party. It is the higher decision making body of the party. It consists of several office holders of the party, including up to seven vice-presidents, up to five general secretaries, one general secretary (organisation), one treasurer and up to seven secretaries who work directly with the president.

The National Executive has the authority to interpret the Articles and Rules of the party constitution. The Executive can also amend, alter and add to the party constitution which is subject to rectification by the following Plenary Session or Special Session of National Council. The National Executive also oversees the internal elections to the President and the National Council and appoints a returning officer for conducting the triennial election of the party.

An identical structure, with a State Executive Committee led by a State President, exists at the state level.

Parliamentary Board
The Parliamentary Board is the governing body of the BJP which takes day-to-day decisions on behalf of the National Executive. The National Executive sets up a Parliamentary Board consisting of Party President and ten other members. The Parliamentary Board supervises the activities of the parliamentary and legislative groups of the Party. It guides and regulates all the organisational units under the National Executive.

Central Election Committee
The Central Election Committee, is also set up by the National Executive, and consist of the 11 members of the Parliamentary Board and 8 other members elected by the National Executive. The role of the CEC is to select candidates for all Legislative and Parliamentary elections throughout India.

National Council
The National Council is the highest policy making body of the party. It is also responsible for rectification of any amendment, alteration and addition to the party constitution by National Executive in the following Plenary Session or Special Session. The National Council along with the State Council also elects the President every three year. The National Council consists of members that are elected by the State Councils, 10% of the parliamentary party, former national Presidents, leaders of state legislative assemblies and state legislative councils, members nominated by the national president, all members of the National Executive, presidents of Morchas and Cells.

State level
There are several State units of the Bharatiya Janata Party.

District Committee
District Committee is an important grassroots level organisation of BJP with one President, Six Vice President and Four General Secretary and Six Secretaries. The District Committee has Other members also.

Mandal
The Mandal Committee of BJP has one president with two general secretary and four secretaries

Wings

Mahila Morcha
Mahila Morcha (IPA: Mahilā Mōrcā), is the women's wing of the Bharatiya Janata Party  (BJP) of India. Vanathi Srinivasan, former Tamil Nadu BJP Unit Vice president and current Member of the Tamil Nadu Legislative Assembly from Coimbatore South state assembly constituency is the national president of the wing.

International 
-USA, is a registered foreign agent, on behalf of the Bharatiya Janata Party.

Membership

Any Indian citizen of the age of 18 years or above can become a member of the Party, provided that he is not a member of any other political party. The term of membership will ordinarily be of 6 years. , it is the world's largest political party in terms of primary membership.

State Presidents
The State Presidents of state or UT unit of BJP are appointed by the National President.

See also
 Bharatiya Janata Party, Gujarat
 Bharatiya Janata Party, Uttar Pradesh
 Bharatiya Janata Party, Madhya Pradesh
 Bharatiya Janata Party, West Bengal
 Bharatiya Janata Party, Karnataka
 Bharatiya Janata Party, Maharashtra
 Bharatiya Janata Party, Andhra Pradesh
 Bharatiya Janata Party, Telangana
 Bharatiya Janata Party, Uttarakhand
 Bharatiya Janata Party, Goa
 Bharatiya Janata Party, Bihar
 Bharatiya Janata Party, Haryana
 Bharatiya Janata Party, Rajasthan
 Bharatiya Janata Party, Himachal Pradesh
 Bharatiya Janata Party, Assam
 Bharatiya Janata Party, Tripura
 Bharatiya Janata Party, Andhra Pradesh
 Bharatiya Janata Party, Meghalaya
 Bharatiya Janata Party, Odisha
 Bharatiya Janata Party, Arunachal Pradesh
 Bharatiya Janata Party, Chhattisgarh
 Bharatiya Janata Party, Jharkhand

References

Citations

Sources
 

Bharatiya Janata Party
Organizational structure of political parties